The 2020 Wesley Wolverines football team represented Wesley College in the 2020–21 NCAA Division III football season. They were led by third-year head coach Chip Knapp and played their home games at Drass Field at Scott D. Miller Stadium. They were a member of the New Jersey Athletic Conference (NJAC) and finished with a record of 2–1, placing second in the conference. It was the school's final season, as the college was sold to Delaware State University following the year.

Schedule

References

Wesley
Wesley Wolverines football seasons
Wesley Wolverines football
Wesley Wolverines football